Spodiopogon sibiricus is a species of perennial grass in the family Poaceae.

It is native to Siberia, Mongolia, China, Korea, and Japan.

Culms are solitary, erect, 70–200 cm in height, 2–4 mm in diameter, and unbranched.

Common names
 frost grass
 Siberian graybeard
 silverspike

References

sibiricus
Grasses of Asia
Grasses of China
Grasses of Russia
Flora of Japan
Flora of Jiangsu
Flora of Korea
Flora of Manchuria
Flora of Mongolia
Flora of Siberia
Flora of the Russian Far East
Plants described in 1820